John Holmes (1828 – 24 September 1879) was a Canadian politician and surveyor.

He was born in Newtownforbes, County Longford, Ireland in 1828, the son of Alexander Holmes, and was educated in Ireland. He came to Upper Canada in 1846 and settled in Huntley Township where he became a provincial land surveyor. He married Eliza Graham. Holmes served seven years as reeve for the township and was also warden for Carleton County for five years. He served as captain in the local militia from 1866 to 1875.

Elected in the Canadian federal election of 1867, he served as the Liberal-Conservative Member of Parliament representing the riding of Carleton in the province of Ontario. He was defeated in the 1872 and 1874 elections, and never again sat in Parliament. He died in Christchurch, New Zealand in 1879.

Electoral record

References 

Members of the House of Commons of Canada from Ontario
Conservative Party of Canada (1867–1942) MPs
Reeves of Huntley Township
1828 births
1879 deaths
Politicians from County Longford
Canadian expatriates in New Zealand